Yocheved Bat-Miriam (pen name of Yocheved Zhlezniak) (5 March 1901 – 7 January 1980) was an Israeli poet. Bat-Miriam was Born in Belorussia to a Hasidic family. She studied pedagogy in Kharkov and at the universities of Odessa and Moscow. During this period, she participated in the revolutionary literary activities of the “Hebrew Octoberists”, a Communist literary group, and one of her  earliest poem-cycles, a paean to revolutionary Russia entitled Erez (Land) was published in the group's anthology in 1926. She is unusual among Hebrew poets in expressing nostalgia for the landscapes of the country of her birth. Yocheved migrated to British Palestine, later to be called Israel, in 1928. Her first book of poetry, Merahok ("From a distance") was published in 1929. In 1948, her son Nahum (Zuzik) Hazaz from the writer Haim Hazaz died in the 1947–1949 Palestine war. Since then she never wrote a poem again.

Selected works
 1929: Merahok ("From a distance").
 1937: Erets Yisra'el ("The Land of Israel").
 1940: Re'ayon ("Interview"). 
 1942: Demuyot meofek ("Images from the Horizon"). 
 1942: Mishirei Russyah ("Poems of Russia").
 1943: Shirim La-Ghetto ("Poems for the Ghetto").
 1963: Shirim ("Poems").
 1975: Beyn Chol Va-Shemesh ("Between Sand and Sun").
 2014: Machatzit Mul Machatzit : Kol Ha-Shirim ("Collected Poems").

Awards
 In 1963, Bat-Miriam was awarded the Brenner Prize for literature.
 In 1964, Bat-Miriam was awarded the Bialik Prize for literature.
In 1972, she was awarded the Israel Prize, for literature.

See also
List of Bialik Prize recipients
List of Israel Prize recipients

References

Further reading
 The Modern Hebrew Poem Itself, 2nd new edition, by Stanley Burnshaw, T. Carmi, Susan Glassman, Ariel Hirschfield and Ezra Spicehandler (editors), published 31 March 2002, .
 A Language Silenced : The Suppression of Hebrew Literature and Culture in the Soviet Union, by Jehoshua A. Gilboa. Fairleigh Dickinson Univ. Press, published 1982,  / 
 And Rachel Stole the Idols : The Emergence of Modern Hebrew Women's Writing, by Wendy Zierler. Wayne State Univ. Press, published 2004,  / .

External links
 Translation of a portion of Bat-Miriam's Cranes from the Threshold

1901 births
1980 deaths
Jews from the Russian Empire
Belarusian Jews
Israeli Ashkenazi Jews
Soviet emigrants to Israel
Israeli people of Belarusian-Jewish descent
Brenner Prize recipients
Israel Prize in literature recipients
Israel Prize women recipients
Israeli women poets
Israeli poets
20th-century women writers
20th-century poets
Burials at Kiryat Shaul Cemetery
Jewish women writers